The 1945 All-Big Six Conference football team consists of American football players chosen by various organizations for All-Big Six Conference teams for the 1945 college football season.  The selectors for the 1945 season included the Associated Press (AP).

All-Big Six selections

Backs
 Leonard Brown, Missouri (AP-1)
 Richard Howard, Iowa State (AP-1)
 John West, Oklahoma (AP-1)
 Jack Venable, Oklahoma (AP-1)

Ends
 Roland Oakes, Missouri (AP-1)
 David Schmidt, Kansas (AP-1)

Tackles
 Jim Kekeris, Missouri (AP-1)
 Thomas Tallchief, Oklahoma (AP-1)

Guards
 Jack Fathauer, Iowa State (AP-1)
 Thurman Tigart, Oklahoma (AP-1)

Centers
 Ralph Stewart, Missouri (AP-1)

Key
AP = Associated Press

See also
1945 College Football All-America Team

References

All-Big Six Conference football team
All-Big Eight Conference football teams